Eva Mirones (born 8 February 1976) is a Spanish rower. She competed in the women's lightweight double sculls event at the 2004 Summer Olympics.

References

1976 births
Living people
Spanish female rowers
Olympic rowers of Spain
Rowers at the 2004 Summer Olympics
Sportspeople from San Sebastián
Rowers from the Basque Country (autonomous community)